Nadia Baher Sirry is a Cairo-born painter of Turkish-Lebanese descent, born in 1958.

Life
Sirry is a graduate of Ain Shams University. She worked for a time at the British Institute in Egypt before devoting herself full-time to her artistic career. She currently lives and works in Cairo.

Membership
Member of the Syndicate of Plastic Arts.
Member of the National Society of Fine Arts.
Member of Cairo Atelier – union of artists and writers.
Member of  Fine Art Lovers Society.
Member of Art Companions Group.
Member of the Egyptian Arts Preservation Society.

Private Exhibitions
Shadicor art gallery (Reality and Fantasy)  March 2006
Saad Zaghloul Cultural Center (Tangible Dreams) April 2006 
The Russian Cultural Center in Alexandria (Between Contemplation and Dreams) August 2006
Ewart Gallery the American University in Cairo ( Contemplation of the Heart) March 2007
Alexandria Center of Arts (Touches) August 2007
The Syndicate of Journalists (Bicar) show room  (Vision) June 2008
Cairo Opera House (Salah Taher Hall) exhibition (The Feather) December 2015

Collective Exhibitions
Participating in Collective shows since college in 1978
Ismailia Cultural Center 2005
Shadicor Gallery 2006
Spring exhibition at El Sawi Cultural Wheel, April 2006
The Third Art Festival of the National Society of Art At Alexandria Art Center, August 2006.
Egyptian Opera House December 2006 with the National Society of Fine Arts.
Art for Every Family exhibition at Shadicor Gallery, March 2007
Spring Second Salon at el Sawi Cultural Wheel, April 2007
Eastern Harmonies exhibition at Al-Ghawri Historical Palace organized by the National Society of Arts and sponsored by the Cultural Development Fund, April 2007
Exhibition of Acquisitions at the Opera House Palace of Arts, April 2007
The (Pentagonous) exhibition at Shadicor gallery - May 2007
The (Salon Gallery) at the Opera House Art Palace. May – June 2007
(The Desert) exhibition with Art Companions Society, July 2007
National Society of Fine Arts( 20th Salon) at the Opera House 2008
(Art for Every Family) at Shadicor gallery for arts, March 2008
Art companions exhibition at the future library, March 2008
Cairo Atelier (Salon 56th) in August 2008
Exhibition in favor of the Children Cancer Hospital of the Opera House in August 2008
(Egypt in My Mind) exhibition at the Alexandria Center of Arts with the Egyptian Art Preservation Society, November 2008
Art Companions Fourth exhibition at the Future Library December 2008
Shadicor gallery exhibition (Art for All Family), March 2009.
(Exhibition of Acquisitions) at Port Said Museum of Modern Arts, April 2009 
(National Exhibition) Twenty Third (Third Festival of Fine Arts) 2009
Art Companions Fifth exhibition at the Opera House October 2009
Exhibition at the Syndicate of Plastic Artists with Art Preservation society September 2009
Cairo Atelier Salon Fifty Seven September 2009
(Art Companion Group 6th Exhibition) at The Greek Cultural Center – January 2010
Exhibition (I am an Egyptian) at the Opera House with Art Preservation Society January 2010
Art for every family exhibition 2010 at Shadicor Gallery
Exhibition entitled (Creative Artists) at Effat Nagy and Saad El Khadem Museum March 2010
National Association of  Fine Arts ( 21st Salon) May 2010
Exhibition for nine artists at Shadicor Gallery 2010 
Cairo Atelier ( Salon Fifty Eight) - September 2010
(Twenty Fifth of January Tunes) at Road El Farag Cultural Center affiliated to the Egyptian Art Preservation Society 2011
(Egyptian Art in Revolution) Sharm El Sheikh at Hilton Waterfalls Sharm 2011
Exhibition (Art for every family) at Shadicor Gallery 2011
National Society of  Fine Arts (Twenty Second Salon) at the Opera House main show room 2011
Exhibition at Saad Zaghlol Cultural Center by the Egyptian Art  Preservation Society and the ministry of culture – September 2011
Exhibition (Sahwa 2) at El Hanager show room – Opera House – February 2012
Exhibition (Nubian Heritage) at the Supreme Council of Culture – March 2012
Exhibition (Art for every family) 2012
Exhibition (Creations) for Coptic Arts at Al-Ghawri Dome – May 2012
Exhibition (Different Visions 2) at Al-Ghawri Dome – affiliated to the Cultural Development Fund Association and the Egyptian Art Preservation Society – October 2012
Exhibition (Peace Mission) at Al-Ghawri Dome as a part of the monthly event of Peace Mission celebration – December 2012
Exhibition (Egyptian Creations) at the Opera House Salah Taher Gallery – January 2013
Exhibition (Glimpse of Egypt) at Road El Farag Cultural Center – February 2013
Exhibition (Art for Every family) Shadicor Art Gallery – April 2013
Guest of Honor for Exhibition (Artist Adel Sabet and Art Learners) – June 2013
Exhibition (Egyptian Features) at the Coptic Museum as a part of the Culture and Art Festival – October 2013
Exhibition (Egyptian Features 2) at Saad El Khadem and Effat Nagy Museum – October 2013
Exhibition (Egyptian Features 3) at Banha Cultural Center supervised by the General Organization of Cultural Palaces – October 2013
Exhibition (Egyptian Features 4) at Giza Cultural Center organized by both the General Organization of Cultural Palaces and the Egyptian Art Preservation Society – December 2013
(Cairo Atelier Salon for Painting) Mohamed Nagi Round – March 2014
Exhibition (Art for Every Family) Shadicor Art Gallery – March 2014
Exhibition (Love for Egypt) in favor of the Egyptian Fund Box at Salah Taher Gallery – Opera House – April 2014
Exhibition (Egyptian Vision of the World) ten artists from the Art Companions Group at the Egyptian Center for International Cultural Cooperation – April 2014
Exhibition (Female Artists) organized by The National Society of  Fine Arts at El Shaer House - July 2014
Exhibition  (Beauty of Islamic Arts) at Prince Taz Palace – February 2015 
National Society of Fine Arts Salon at the Opera House Art Gallery – March 2015.
International Exhibitions:
The Fourth Intercontinental Biennial of Indigenous Millenarian Art in Quito Ecuador – October 2012
The traveling Gallery of the Intercontinental Biennial of Indigenous – Millenarian Art in Toronto Canada – June 2013
The Fifth Intercontinental Biennial of Indigenous Millenarian Art in Quito Ecuador August 2014
Traveling Gallery "Recreando El Planeta" coordinated by IR-MANO Artistas Latinoamericanos Brazil and the Ministry of exterior affairs in Uruguay held at Santos Palace, Montevideo Uruguay November 2014.

Local Awards
 Several Certificates of Appreciation for participation in different exhibitions
Honored and awarded a certificate of appreciation from the Minister of Culture and the Director of Fine Arts Sector 2012 and 2015.
Honored by The Egyptian Arts Preservation Society 2015.
Honored by The National Society of Fine Arts 2015.

International Awards
Special Award in Watercolor Painting from the Fourth Intercontinental Biennial of Indigenous- Millenarian Art - October 2012
First Award in Painting from at the Fifth Intercontinental Biennial of Indigenous-Millenarian Art – August 2014.

Acquisitions

The Egyptian Museum of Modern Art
Agricultural Museum of Egypt
Contemporary Art Museum of the Casa De La Cultura Ecuatoriana in Quito, Ecuador
International Biennial of Indigenous – Millenarian Art Acquisitions – Quito, Ecuador

References

External links
 Official website

1958 births
Living people
Egyptian women painters
20th-century Egyptian painters
21st-century Egyptian painters
20th-century Egyptian women artists
21st-century Egyptian women artists
Artists from Cairo